Paris Historic District is a national historic district located at Paris, Fauquier County, Virginia.  It encompasses 53 contributing resources in the rural village of Paris.  The district includes primarily residences, although the district also includes some commercial buildings, churches, a former school, and a
cemetery. Fifty-two of the 53 contributing resources are already listed as part of the Crooked Run Valley Rural Historic District.  Notable buildings include "Wagoner's Stand" (c. 1820), the Josiah Murray House (c. 1820), the William Peck House, Old Paris Meeting House (c. 1830), the Willis-Carr House (c. 1840), the former Rogers Store (c. 1850), and Trinity United Methodist Church (1892).

It was listed on the National Register of Historic Places in 2007.

References

External links

Watts Ashby Tavern, State Routes 759 & 701, Paris, Fauquier County, VA: 6 photos at Historic American Buildings Survey

Historic American Buildings Survey in Virginia
Historic districts in Fauquier County, Virginia
Federal architecture in Virginia
Greek Revival architecture in Virginia
National Register of Historic Places in Fauquier County, Virginia
Historic districts on the National Register of Historic Places in Virginia